The 2015 CONCACAF Gold Cup was the 13th edition of the CONCACAF Gold Cup competition and the 23rd CONCACAF regional championship overall in the organization's fifty-four years of existence. It was held in the United States, with two matches being played in Canada, marking the first time the CONCACAF Gold Cup was played in that country.

Mexico won the competition after surviving both the quarter-finals and semi-finals in controversial circumstances, defeating Jamaica – the first Caribbean nation to reach such a stage – in the final.
Of the co-hosts, Canada was eliminated in the group stage, while the United States, the defending champions, lost in the semi-finals to Jamaica. The competition included a third place match for the first time since 2003, in which Panama defeated the United States.

Qualification for other tournaments
The 2015 CONCACAF Gold Cup was used for qualification for the 2017 FIFA Confederations Cup, to be played in Russia, and the Copa América Centenario, to be played in the United States in 2016.

FIFA Confederations Cup

As champions of the 2015 CONCACAF Gold Cup, Mexico qualified for a one-off play-off match against the United States, the champion of the 2013 CONCACAF Gold Cup, to decide which team will represent CONCACAF in the 2017 FIFA Confederations Cup. Mexico won the match 3-2 after extra time.

Copa América Centenario

In addition, Panama, Trinidad and Tobago, Haiti, and Cuba, being the top four teams in the tournament not already qualified, qualified for play-offs which determined the remaining two teams to participate in the Copa América Centenario in 2016. The United States, Mexico, Costa Rica (winners of the 2014 Copa Centroamericana), and Jamaica (winners of the 2014 Caribbean Cup) had already qualified before the tournament, with Panama and Haiti rounding out the six representatives CONCACAF sent to the Copa América Centenario following their play-off victories over Cuba and Trinidad and Tobago, respectively.

Qualified teams

A total of 12 teams qualified for the tournament. Three berths were allocated to North America, four to Central America, and four to the Caribbean. For the first time, the two overall fifth-placed teams of the Caribbean zone and the Central American zone competed for the final berth of the CONCACAF Gold Cup. Previously, five berths were allocated to Central America and four were allocated to the Caribbean.

Bold indicates that the corresponding team was hosting the event.

Venues
A total of 14 venues were used for the tournament. CONCACAF announced the host cities and venues for the tournament on December 16, 2014. Apart from Lincoln Financial Field in Philadelphia which hosted the final and PPL Park in Chester which hosted the third place match (both located in the Philadelphia metropolitan area), the other 12 venues hosted two matches. The assignment of matches for the knockout round and the awarding of the final were announced on March 12, 2015.

Draw
The seeded teams which headed up each group was announced on December 16, 2014: United States (Group A), Costa Rica (Group B), and Mexico (Group C). Seeded teams were determined based on November 27, 2014 FIFA rankings (shown in brackets).

The composition of the groups and the schedule of the tournament were announced by CONCACAF on March 12, 2015.

Squads

An initial provisional list of 35 players had to be submitted to CONCACAF before June 7, 2015. A final list containing 23 players was to have been submitted for June 27, 2015. Three of the players named in the final list had to be goalkeepers. The players named in the final list had to wear shirts numbered 1 to 23, with number 1 reserved for a goalkeeper.

Teams qualifying for the quarter-final stage were permitted to replace up to six players. The replacements had to  have been named on the provisional list and would be given a shirt numbered between 24 and 29.

An injured player from the final list could be replaced by another from provisional list 24 hours before his national team's first game.

Match officials

Referees

  David Gantar
  Henry Bejarano
  Ricardo Montero
  Wálter Quesada
  Yadel Martínez
  Joel Aguilar
  Elmer Bonilla
  Marlon Mejía
  Walter López
  Armando Castro
  Óscar Moncada
  Héctor Rodríguez
  Roberto García
  Fernando Guerrero
  César Ramos
  John Pitti
  Mark Geiger
  Jair Marrufo

Assistant referees

  Daniel Belleau
  Philippe Brière
  Warner Castro
  Octavio Jara
  Leonel Leal
  Hiran Dopico
  William Torres
  Juan Zumba
  Hermenerito Leal
  Gersón López
  Cristian Ramírez
  Ricardo Morgan
  Garnet Page
  José Luis Camargo
  Alberto Morín
  Daniel Williamson
  Eric Boria
  Peter Manikowski
  CJ Morgante

Group stage
The top two teams from each group and the two best third-placed teams qualified for the quarter-finals. All match times listed are in Eastern Daylight Time (EDT).

Tiebreakers
The ranking of each team in each group was determined as follows:
 Greatest number of points obtained in group matches
 Goal difference in all group matches
 Greatest number of goals scored in all group matches
 Greatest number of points obtained in group matches between the teams concerned;
 Drawing of lots by the Gold Cup Committee.

Group A

Group B

Group C

Ranking of third-placed teams

Knockout stage

All match times listed are in Eastern Daylight Time (EDT).

Quarter-finals

Semi-finals

Third place play-off

Final

Goalscorers

7 goals
 Clint Dempsey

6 goals
 Andrés Guardado

4 goals
 Oribe Peralta

2 goals

 Duckens Nazon
 Darren Mattocks
 Giles Barnes
 Garath McCleary
 Carlos Vela
 Luis Tejada
 Sheldon Bateau
 Keron Cummings
 Kenwyne Jones
 Michael Bradley

1 goal

 Roy Miller
 David Ramírez
 Bryan Ruiz
 Maikel Reyes
 Dustin Corea
 Carlos Ruiz
 Carlos Discua
 Andy Najar
 Rodolph Austin
 Jobi McAnuff
 Giovani dos Santos
 Jesús Corona
 Paul Aguilar
 Roberto Nurse
 Blas Pérez
 Alberto Quintero
 Román Torres
 Andre Boucaud
 Cordell Cato
 Joevin Jones
 Yohance Marshall
 Omar Gonzalez
 Aron Jóhannsson
 Gyasi Zardes

1 own goal
 Kenwyne Jones (against Mexico)

Awards

Winners

Individual awards
The following awards were given at the conclusion of the tournament.
 Golden Ball Award:  Andrés Guardado
 Golden Boot Award:  Clint Dempsey
 Golden Glove Award:  Brad Guzan
 Bright Future Award:  Jesús Corona
 Fair Play Award:

Prize money
The total amount of prize money offered by CONCACAF for the tournament is US$2.75 million, with $1 million being the top prize. Listed below is a breakdown of how the total amount is to be distributed:

$100k – To each team eliminated in the group stage (4 teams)
$125k – To each team eliminated in the quarter-finals (4 teams)
$150k – Fourth placed team
$200k – Third placed team
$500k – Runners-up
$1 mil – Winners

Theme songs

"You Are Unstoppable" by Austrian singer Conchita Wurst was the official anthem for the tournament.

"All the Way" by Reykon featuring Bebe Rexha was used for Univision's coverage of the tournament.

Awolnation's "I Am" was used for Fox's coverage.

Media
Multiple officials of Traffic Sports were identified in the 2015 FIFA corruption case, which alleged that bribes related to the 2015 Gold Cup amounted to two-thirds of the cost of staging the tournament.

Worldwide TV broadcasting rights

Broadcasting

Controversies

Jamaican players' strike 
On July 6, the Jamaica national football team refused to attend a 7pm practice session at the StubHub Center because of a strike over bonus fees. The next day, Jamaica Football Federation president Horace Burrell announced the situation had been "settled" and thanked the players for backing down.

Cuban defections
Cuban attacker Keiler García defected to the United States in Chicago on July 8, the day before his team's opening game against Mexico at Soldier Field.  He did not show up for the team breakfast in the hotel and was absent from the subsequent training session. Because of problems obtaining US visas for players and staff, and the defection of García, Cuba only had 16 players available for the opening game against Mexico. Arael Argüellez also defected in Chicago, after being visited in the hotel by friends. He failed to turn up for the national team's flight to Phoenix to Cuba's second match, against Trinidad and Tobago.

On July 14, Darío Suárez did not return from his trip to a supermarket prior to the match against Guatemala in Charlotte. Later the same day, midfielder Ariel Martínez was reported in tears on the bus returning to the hotel following the 1–0 victory over Guatemala to qualify for the quarter-final stage.  Upon arrival, he exited the bus, said goodbye to the coach and then ran off into the night.

Cuban US visa issues
Cuba's opening game against Mexico was affected by United States visa issues. The head coach Raúl González Triana and six players (Adrián Diz, Arichel Hernandez, Daniel Luis, Andy Vaquero, Maikel Reyes and Sandy Sánchez) were unable to enter the United States before the match against Mexico which took place on the third day of the competition. They had all recently been involved in the 2015 CONCACAF Men's Olympic Qualifying Championship qualification tournament in Antigua and Barbuda and it had caused some administration issues.

Arichel Hernández did not enter the United States at all because of visa problems.

Controversial refereeing
During the quarter-final match between Mexico and Costa Rica, Walter López's assistant referee Eric Boria marked a penalty for Mexico, in the last minute of stoppage time in the second half of extra time, for a push by Costa Rican defender Roy Miller on Oribe Peralta.  Mexico's Andrés Guardado scored the penalty, eliminating Costa Rica. Daniel Jiménez of La Nación described the elimination as "a theft", although Costa Rica's coach defended the call saying "he [the referee] is human. He saw something in the area and that's why he called the penalty." Miller himself claimed Peralta's reaction was "exaggerated" and that there had only been minimal contact between them. In an interview conceded to Prensa Libre on July 23, Wálter López admitted that the call was mistaken, alleging that "due to my position on the field, I was unable to properly see the action. It was my assistant who helped me".

In the semi-final match between Mexico and Panama, the US referee Mark Geiger lost control of the match which began with him showing a questionable red card to Panama's Luis Tejada in the 24th minute. Later, as a 10-man Panama was a minute away from winning the match 1-0, he also awarded Mexico a controversial penalty kick for a handball. While defending in the penalty box against the Mexican midfielder Carlos Esquivel, Panama's captain Román Torres lost balance and fell backwards on the ball, touching it (fouls for handling the ball must be deliberate). The decision to award the penalty kick outraged the Panama team who walked off the field and threatened to abandon the match. While the players were involved in a long scuffle with the officials, coaches and other players on the sidelines, the fans repeatedly pelted them with beer glasses and objects. Panama returned to the field after approximately ten minutes. Andrés Guardado scored the penalty and forced the match into extra time, which Mexico subsequently won.  After the final whistle, the Panamanian players and coaching staff ran en masse on the field towards the referees, who had to be escorted off the field by security. Later, Guardado said in the interview that it hurt to take the penalty and he considered missing the kick on purpose, but "had to be professional". Mexico's coach Miguel Herrera argued there was no reason for Guardado to purposely miss the kick, referencing the controversial decision that awarded a penalty to the Netherlands over Mexico at the World Cup. "I didn't hear that question in the World Cup when we were knocked out for a penalty that wasn't", he said. "It seems that only Mexico should declare itself guilty."

On July 23, the Football Associations from both Panama and Costa Rica released their respective statements on their websites regarding such controversies, and requesting the removal of the CONCACAF referees committee members.

On July 24, the CONCACAF Disciplinary Committee suspended the Panamanian goalkeeper Jaime Penedo for two matches for insulting the referee.  This meant he would miss the Cup's third-place game and a World Cup qualifier game in November.  On top of missing the third-place game because of the red card, forward Luis Tejada was given an additional one match suspension for insulting the referee.

Panama team banner 
After the semi-final match against Mexico, the Panamanian players reunited in their locker room and brandished a banner which read "CONCACAF Ladrones ("CONCACAF thieves") and three times "Corruptos" ("corrupt"), while pointing thumbs down in protest.  The image was then circulated on Twitter.  The CONCACAF Disciplinary Committee subsequently fined Panamanian Football Federation $15,000 for this display.

Referee Committee controversy

Both the Costa Rican Football Federation and Panamanian Football Federation publicly called for those within the Referee Committee at CONCACAF to be removed from their position.

CONCACAF announced that they would discuss the matter at their executive committee meeting.

Tournament organization

United States captain Michael Bradley criticized the organization of the tournament, commenting that there was too much traveling involved for teams and the stadiums had poor playing surfaces, while questioning the need for the two best third-placed teams to qualify to the next round. Mexico's head coach Miguel Herrera was also critical of the travel arrangements "It's a disorder in the airplanes, having rival teams on the same flight, with so much people from CONCACAF, we were all squeezed in, we didn't even have room for our luggage, there was no room for our baggage, Mexico has been transporting their luggage on road and that's how we have been working". Both Herrera and Bradley were fined by CONCACAF for their comments.

References

External links

CONCACAF Gold Cup , CONCACAF.com

 
2015
CONCACAF Gold Cup
CONCACAF Gold Cup
CONCACAF Gold Cup
2015 CONCACAF Gold Cup
2015 CONCACAF Gold Cup